Marcus Nash  (born 1976) is an American football wide receiver

Marcus Nash may also refer to:

Marcus Nash (actor) (born 1994), Scottish actor
Marcus Nash (skier) (born 1971), American Olympic skier